Diane Thomas (born Diane Fowler), known professionally as Sunset Thomas, is an American artist and former pornographic actress. She was runner-up for Penthouse Pet of the Year in 1998 and is a member of the AVN, XRCO, and Legends of Erotica halls of fame.

Personal life 
Thomas worked as a prostitute at the Moonlite BunnyRanch, and according to Dennis Hof made $2000 a night. She later told interviewer Andrew Anthony that there is no real difference between pornography and prostitution.

Thomas is the aunt of porn star Sunrise Adams. Thomas dated Dennis Hof, the owner of Moonlight BunnyRanch, during her tenure there, and during that time legally adopted the name Diane Hof.

Adult film career 

Thomas was inducted into the AVN Hall of Fame in 2001. After appearing in the documentary series Cathouse, Thomas was featured in the 2005 documentary Pornstar Pets and made an appearance on Maury, in which she encountered a crush from her middle school days. The episode was titled 'I Was An Ugly Teen... Now I'm a Hot, Sexy 10!'. In 2006, Thomas obtained her own show on KSEX radio called Sunset After Sunset. In 2007, she appeared on the Montel Williams Show to discuss her porn career and being a mother.

In April 2009 Thomas released her erotic fiction novel, Anatomy of an Adult Film, which was largely a fictionalized account of her adult film career. She was inducted into the Legends of Erotica Hall of Fame in 2009 and the XRCO Hall of Fame in April 2010.

Writing
Thomas has written boxing columns for Doghouseboxing.com.

References

External links

 
 
 

Actresses from Fort Lauderdale, Florida
American artists
American female adult models
American pornographic film actresses
American prostitutes
Living people
Penthouse Pets
People from Daytona Beach, Florida
People from Sikeston, Missouri
Pornographic film actors from Florida
Pornographic film actors from Missouri
Year of birth missing (living people)
21st-century American women